Baksan is the name of several inhabited localities in the Kabardino-Balkar Republic, Russia.

Urban localities
Baksan (town), a town; administratively incorporated as a town of republic significance; 

Rural localities
Baksan (rural locality), a rural locality classified as a road crossing in Maysky District;